Macdonald Airport  is located  northwest of Macdonald, Manitoba, Canada.

References

Registered aerodromes in Manitoba